Pregnant patients' rights regarding medical care during the pregnancy and childbirth are specifically a patient's rights within a medical setting and should not be confused with pregnancy discrimination. A great deal of discussion regarding pregnant patients' rights has taken place in the United States.

History
In Western countries, medical services used during labor and delivery have increased since the 1930s. Starting in the 1950s, with the natural childbirth movement gaining strength, concern increased over typical hospital practices during childbirth. These medical services included medications and procedures that were not always necessary some of which had potential to harm the mother, the baby, or both. Various health-related and consumer organization groups began to advocate for a pregnant woman's right to be informed about medical services related to pregnancy and childbirth and for her right to refuse such services.

In the United States, the American College of Obstetricians and Gynecologists (ACOG) acknowledged the legal obligation of physicians to obtain informed consent for procedures related to pregnancy and childbirth in 1974.

Decision-making regarding pregnant patients' care
A 1987 study found that, in the preceding decade, at least 22 hospitals in the United States sought direction from the courts regarding care for pregnant patients. Fifteen court orders were sought, all but one without careful study of the legal facts of the case.

In a landmark 1990 case, George Washington University Medical Center (GWUMC) announced a new policy regarding pregnant patients' rights as part of the out-of-court settlement of a case in which a pregnant patient, Angela Carder, died. The new policy stated that decisions regarding medical care for pregnant patients would be made by the patient herself, her doctors, and her family, not by the courts. Although the settlement applied only to GWUMC, the new policy, considered the most comprehensive of its kind at the time, was expected to influence other institutions.

Specific rights advocated
Advocates endorse a pregnant patient's right to participate in medical decisions that may affect her well-being and that of her child. Specifically, these include but are not limited to the right to know the effects and risks to both the woman and the child associated with a drug or procedure, as well as the right to know about additional and alternative treatments.

Some groups, such as the American Hospital Association in its "Patient's Bill of Rights", advocate additional rights, including rights to the following:
To receive medical assistance regardless of where the patient gives birth (whether at home, in a hospital, etc.).
To refuse drug treatment of any kind.
To be accompanied during labor and birth by a person or persons she cares for and to whom she looks for emotional support.
To labor at her own pace without intervention if she chooses.
To choose her own birthing position.
To keep her baby at her bedside immediately after birth if the baby does not require specialized care, and to feed the baby according to a schedule she decides rather than according to a standard hospital regimen.

See also
Patient advocacy
Patient empowerment
Pregnant patients' rights, which addresses the subject throughout the world
Women's rights in the United States

References

Maternity in the United States
Children's rights in the United States
Health policy in the United States
Women's rights in the United States